Carex flagellifera, the weeping brown sedge or Glen Murray tussock sedge, is a species of flowering plant in the family Cyperaceae. It is native to Tasmania, New Zealand, and the Chatham Islands, and it has been introduced to the Kermadec Islands and Great Britain.
There are a number of cultivars, including 'Auburn Cascade', 'Coca-Cola', 'Frosted Curls', 'Kiwi', 'Rapunzel', and 'Toffee Twist'.

References

flagellifera
Ornamental plants
Flora of Tasmania
Flora of the North Island
Flora of the South Island
Flora of the Chatham Islands
Plants described in 1884